General meanings of Roundel include:

Roundel, a circular symbol
used in heraldry: Roundel (heraldry)
used on military aircraft as a sign of nationality: Military aircraft insignia 
Roundel enclosure, a neolithic monument type: Neolithic circular enclosures in Central Europe
Roundel (fortification), a type of circular artillery tower
A Rondel dagger, a circular knife
A Tondo (art), a large circular piece of art
Roundel (poetry), a form of verse in English language poetry

Specific instances
London Underground Roundel, the logo for transport in London
Royal Air Force roundels, identification marks used by the British Airforces
Roundel (magazine), a monthly periodical from the BMW Car Club of America
"Roundel: The little eyes that never knew Light", a song by Sir Edward Elgar to a verse by A. C. Swinburne

See also
Rondache, a small circular shield, used by soldiers in the fourteenth and fifteenth centuries
Rondel (disambiguation)